This is the discography of American singer Sammie.

Albums

Studio albums

Extended plays
 2010: It's Time
 2013: Leigh Bush Project
 2015: Series – 3187
 2016: Series – 31872.0
 2016: I'm Him
 2018: Series – 31873.0

Mixtapes
 2009: Swag & B: Volume 1
 2010: It's Just A Mixtape
 2010: It's Just A Mixtape 2
 2012: Insomnia
 2016: Indigo

Singles

As lead artist

1 The single was a promotion release only.

As featured artist

Guest appearances

Music videos

Notes

References

External links
 
 
 

Discographies of American artists